Expelled Because of Color is a bronze sculpture,  tall, by John Thomas Riddle, Jr. It is located on the grounds of the Georgia State Capitol, 240 State Capitol SW, Atlanta, Georgia. It was commissioned in 1976 by the Georgia Legislative Black Caucus and unveiled on February 16, 1978, the second annual Georgia Association of Black Elected Officials Day.

The statue commemorates the Original 33, the 33 African-American legislators who were expelled from the Georgia legislature in 1868.

A plaque on the sculpture reads: "Expelled Because of Color" is dedicated to the memory of 33 black state legislators who were expelled from the Georgia House because of their color in 1868. The cinder block forms at the base of the sculpture symbolize the building of black political awareness and self-representation in Georgia. Our enslavement, our role in the Revolutionary War, the black church, our labor and the right to vote are components of the black Georgian's struggle from the slave ship to the State House. John Riddle, sculptor

References

External links 
 

1978 establishments in Georgia (U.S. state)
1978 sculptures
African-American history in Atlanta
African-American state legislators in Georgia (U.S. state)
African-American artists
Anti-black racism in the United States
Monuments and memorials in Georgia (U.S. state)
Original 33
Outdoor sculptures in Georgia (U.S. state)
Reconstruction Era
Sculptures in Atlanta
Tourist attractions in Atlanta
African-American monuments and memorials